Acrobasis obrutella is a species of snout moth in the genus Acrobasis. It was described by Hugo Theodor Christoph in 1881. It is found in China and Japan.

References

Moths described in 1881
Acrobasis
Moths of Japan
Moths of Asia